Kulapathi Nāyanār (Tamil: குலபதி நயனார்), also known as Kulapathiyār, was a poet of the Sangam period to whom verse 48 of the Tiruvalluva Maalai is attributed.

Biography
Kulapathi Nāyanār was a poet belonging to the late Sangam period that corresponds between 1st century BCE and 2nd century CE. He is believed to be the head of his clan.

View on Valluvar and the Kural
Kulapathi Nāyanār has authored verse 48 of the Tiruvalluva Maalai. He opines about Valluvar and the Kural text thus:

See also

 Sangam literature
 List of Sangam poets
 Tiruvalluva Maalai

Citations

References

 
 

Tamil philosophy
Tamil poets
Sangam poets
Tiruvalluva Maalai contributors